The Executive Council of Hong Kong (ExCo) is the cabinet of the Government of Hong Kong, acting as a formal body of advisers to the Chief Executive of Hong Kong that serves as a core policy-making organ assisting the Chief Executive. It is analogous to other Executive Councils in the Commonwealth such as the Federal Executive Council of Australia, the Executive Council of New Zealand, and the Privy Council of the United Kingdom.

Under the presidency of the Chief Executive, the Executive Council consists of 21 Official Members (the most senior of these being the Chief Secretary of Hong Kong, head of the Government Secretariat and chair of the Policy Committee), and 16 Non-official Members (also known as ministers without portfolio who are normally leading legislators from pro-establishment political parties) headed by the Convenor of the Non-official Members. The Council normally meets once a week.

History
The Executive Council was set up by the British Hong Kong Government. The first ex officio members were the Colonial Secretary and the Colonial Treasurer in the 1840s. The Attorney General was added in the 1850s. In 1949, the Executive Council had five ex officio members: the senior military officer (Commander of British Forces Overseas), the colonial secretary, the attorney general, the secretary for Chinese affairs and the financial secretary; the Commissioner of Labour, while an 'official' was not an ex officio member. In addition, there were six 'unofficial members': the chief manager of the Hongkong and Shanghai Banking Corporation, the Tai-Pan of Jardine's, a solicitor, two barristers, and a physician.

In 1994 the title 'Senior Member' or 'Senior Unofficial Member' was changed to 'Convenor', when Lydia Dunn was succeeded in the post by Rosanna Wong.

The format of the Executive Council was retained after the transfer of sovereignty in 1997 until a ministerial system (named Principal Officials Accountability System or POAS) was introduced in 2002, Tung Chee Hwa's second term of office. Since then all secretaries are political appointees and have to leave the civil service. All secretaries are appointed to the council, transforming the council effectively into a cabinet. Non-official members are minorities in the council, and are like ministers-without-portfolio. The position of convenor was abolished.

In fulfilling his election platform, Chief Executive Sir Donald Tsang appointed eight new non-official members the day after delivering his first policy address on 12 October 2005. Secretaries of bureaux would sit in meetings of the Council when the agenda was related to their portfolio, and the position of convenor was restored. It was presented as a move to re-strengthen the role of the council as a link with the community.

Change in composition

Functions
The Executive Council is to advise the Chief Executive in policy-making and the administration of the government. The Chief Executive acting after consultation with the Executive Council is known as Chief Executive in Council.

Under Article 54 of the Basic Law, the Chief Executive must consult the Executive Council before making important policy decisions, introducing bills to the Legislative Council, making delegated legislation, regulating certain public institutions, or dissolving LegCo. The Chief Executive in Council also hears appeals and objections under certain Ordinances. A Chief Executive rejecting a majority opinion of the Executive Council is required to put the specific reasons for the rejection on record.

Composition

The members of Executive Council are appointed by the Chief Executive from among principal officials (heads of department, informally called "ministers"), members of Legislative Council, and public figures. Their appointment and removal is decided by the Chief Executive. There is no fixed term of office, but the term of office of members cannot extend beyond the expiry of that of the Chief Executive who appoints them (Article 55 of the Basic Law).

The council is presided over by the Chief Executive. In addition to the 21 principal officials there are 16 Non-official members. Other than the Chief Secretary, Financial Secretary and Secretary for Justice, official members only sit in meetings that are related to their portfolio. In accordance with the Oaths and Declarations Ordinance, the members of the Executive Council should take the Oath of Fidelity after his/her appointment and promise not to reveal any matters being discussed in the council. The aim of this principle was to ensure that the members could speak freely without any fears and pressure, so as to facilitate the Chief Executive to receive prompt and objective advices in the policy making process.

The following list includes all members of the Executive Council in the order of precedence: 
Note: To avoid confusion, all the names on this list follow the Hong Kong convention (English name <if available>, family name, Chinese given name <if available>) for consistency.

Source

List of the past Executive Councils
 1896–1941: List of Executive Council of Hong Kong unofficial members 1896–1941
 1946–1997: List of Executive Council of Hong Kong unofficial members 1946–1997
 1997–2002: First term of Tung Chee-hwa as Chief Executive of Hong Kong
 2002–2005: Second term of Tung Chee-hwa as Chief Executive of Hong Kong
 2005–2007: First term of Donald Tsang as Chief Executive of Hong Kong
 2007–2012: Second term of Donald Tsang as Chief Executive of Hong Kong
 2012–2017: CY Leung as Chief Executive of Hong Kong
 2017–2022: Carrie Lam as Chief Executive of Hong Kong

Location
The Executive Council meets in the Lower Block of the Central Government Complex, Tamar. Until 2012, ExCo met in the Main Wing of the Central Government Offices on Government Hill, in Central and below Government House (former residence of the British Governor of Hong Kong).

Prior to the Handover, the Provisional Executive Council of Hong Kong, headed by Tung Chee Hwa, met in Shenzhen or Tung's office on the 11th floor of the Asia Pacific Finance Tower in Hong Kong. Members of the outgoing British Hong Kong ExCo were not permitted to attend this body.

Both Executive Council sittings were on Tuesdays.

See also

 Legislative Council of Hong Kong
 Politics of Hong Kong
 United Front (China)
 United Front Work Department
 Unofficial members of the Hong Kong Executive Council

References

External links

 

 
Politics of Hong Kong
Hong Kong Executive Council
Lists of political office-holders in Hong Kong
Members of the Executive Council of Hong Kong